Hildasay (from the Old Norse masculine name Hildir with ey "island"), also known as Hildisay, is an uninhabited island off the west coast of the Shetland Mainland.

Geography and geology
It consists of red-green granite (epidotic syenite) that was quarried for many years.

The south coast has two narrow inlets, Cusa Voe and Tangi Voe. "West", the larger of two lochs, has a single islet. A satellite island, Linga lies to the south east. A long line of skerries and holms lies to the north west.

History
Hildasay has been uninhabited since the late nineteenth century, but as late as 1891 had a population of 30. The island's former industries included curing herring and quarrying granite. The remains of a railway line leading from the quarry to the harbour can still be seen.

As of 2020 there was one house on the island, which was temporarily occupied by charity walker Chris Lewis and his dog Jet when movement restrictions were imposed during the COVID-19 pandemic.

Notes and references

Uninhabited islands of Shetland
Former populated places in Scotland
Scalloway Islands